Zahra Gamir (born 18 April 1966) is an Algerian fencer. She competed in the women's individual épée events at the 2000 and 2004 Summer Olympics.

References

External links
 

1966 births
Living people
Algerian female épée fencers
Olympic fencers of Algeria
Fencers at the 2000 Summer Olympics
Fencers at the 2004 Summer Olympics
Mediterranean Games bronze medalists for Algeria
Mediterranean Games medalists in fencing
Competitors at the 2001 Mediterranean Games
21st-century Algerian women
20th-century Algerian women